The Ministry of Industry, Trade and Tourism was a government department in the province of Manitoba, Canada.

It was created in 1988 by the Progressive Conservative government of Gary Filmon, through a merger of the Ministry of Industry, Trade and Technology and the Ministry of Business Development and Tourism. The ministry was eliminated in 1999, and its responsibilities dispersed among other ministries.

List of Ministers of Industry, Trade and Tourism

References

External links
 Committee report on Industry, Trade and Tourism

Industry,_Trade_and_Tourism
Manitoba
Manitoba